Frank Joseph Udvari (January 2, 1924 – August 13, 2014) was a NHL referee from 1952-53 until 1965-66. Udvari was born in Militic, Yugoslavia and raised in Guelph, Ontario. He was the presiding referee during the game which initially sparked the Richard Riot. He was elected into the Hockey Hall of Fame in 1973. He died aged 90 in 2014 in London, Ontario.

External links
 
 

1924 births
2014 deaths
Hockey Hall of Fame inductees
Ice hockey people from Ontario
National Hockey League officials
Sportspeople from Guelph